Kurgha may refer to:

Kurgha, Dhawalagiri, Nepal
Kurgha, Lumbini, Nepal